The National Trust for Canada (formerly known as the Heritage Canada Foundation) is a national registered charity in Canada with the mandate to inspire and lead action to save historic places, and promote the care and wise use of our historic environment.

Its sites, projects, and programs encourage Canadians to identify, conserve, use, celebrate, and value their heritage buildings, landscapes, natural areas, and communities for present and future generations. Established in 1973, the National Trust has campaigned to update and fill gaps in Canadian heritage policies and laws, including supporting legislation such as Heritage Lighthouse Protection Act. The National Trust for Canada also awards municipalities for their actions in preserving historical built environments through the Prince of Wales Prize for Municipal Heritage Leadership.

It is a member-based organization governed by a national board of volunteer governors. Its Council of Advisors include Pat Carney, Thomas H.B. Symons, Douglas Cardinal, John K.F. Irving, Glen MacDonald, Frederic L.R. Jackman, and Alexander Reford.

Properties
The National Trust for Canada oversees three properties. In Quebec, the organization holds two properties: One is the Papineau Chapel, a stone memorial chapel built in 1851 by Louis-Joseph Papineau, on the grounds of the Château Montebello in the town of Montebello. It is the National Trust's first property, having been acquired in 1974. The other is 11 rue de l'Ancien-Chantier, two adjacent buildings erected in 1670, in the Lower Town of Quebec City.

There is also a property in Ontario. The Myrtleville House is a two-storey structure built in Brantford between 1837 and 1838.

See also
 The Prince's Charities

References

External links
 National Trust for Canada
Carleton University Archives and Research Collections

Canada
Historic preservation organizations in Canada
Buildings and structures completed in 1905
1973 establishments in Ontario
Organizations established in 1973